The Stamp Duties Act of 1783 (23 Geo. 3. c. 67) was passed by the House of Commons of Great Britain in order to raise money to pay for the American War of Independence.  Under the provisions of this Act, all baptism, marriage and burial entries in each parish register were subject to a tax of 3d (old pence).  Church ministers were empowered to collect the duty, and were allowed to keep 10% of this fee as compensation for their trouble.  Refusal to pay carried a fine of five pounds.

This was a deeply unpopular tax, and many clergymen were sympathetic to the plight of their parishioners, and as paupers were exempt from this tax, it is not uncommon for family history researchers and genealogists to find that the number of supposed poor people within a parish has increased many times above normal during these years until the act was finally repealed in 1794.  Such entries in a parish register are annotated with either the letter "P." or "Pauper".  If a family could not claim exemption then it was not unusual for them simply not to bother, and this would result in a number of adult "late" baptisms during the following decades.

The Act was repealed by section 1 of the Act 34 Geo. 3 c. 11.

References 
General Register Office of Scotland  http://www.gro-scotland.gov.uk/famrec/hlpsrch/opr.html

Great Britain Acts of Parliament 1783
Tax legislation in the United Kingdom
Repealed Great Britain Acts of Parliament